The New Rambler is an online book review co-founded by Eric Posner, Adrian Vermeule, and Blakey Vermeule in 2015.  It was relaunched under new editorship in August 2019. Its current editors are Cindy Ewing, Connor Ewing, Simon Stern, and Anna Su.

The publication's name is an homage to Samuel Johnson's Rambler.

According to Posner, the new book review aims to publish "high-quality reviews of intellectually ambitious books" that Posner hopes will be comparable to those published by The New York Review of Books and The Times Literary Supplement. The founding of the review was prompted, in part, by Leon Wieseltier's departure from The New Republic, an event that marked the end of that publication's celebrated role as a venue for longform reviews of serious books.
According to Michelle Karnes, a professor of medieval literature at Stanford University who reviewed Kazuo Ishiguro's 2015 novel The Buried Giant for New Rambler, "There's no ideological agenda for the journal, and so you can write what you really think without worrying about offending anyone."

Notable reviews
In 2015, New Rambler published a review of Alice Goffman's On the Run: Fugitive Life in an American City by Steven Lubet, which brought the fledgling publication a "big jolt of attention."

References

External links
The New Rambler

 
Book review magazines
Magazines established in 2015
Magazines published in Chicago